BC Kalev, known as BC Kalev/Cramo for sponsorship reasons, is a professional basketball club based in Tallinn, Estonia. The team plays in the Korvpalli Meistriliiga, the Estonian-Latvian Basketball League and the FIBA Europe Cup. They play their home games at the Kalev Sports Hall and Saku Suurhall.

Kalev/Cramo have won 12 Estonian Championships, 8 Estonian Cups and 1 Latvian-Estonian Basketball League title.

History

Early years (1998–2005)
Founded in 1998, the club started out as Canon ENM. Coached by Allan Dorbek the team joined top-tier Korvpalli Meistriliiga (KML) for the 1998–99 season. The club's first season was a disappointment, as the team finished in last place without winning a single game. In 1999, the team was renamed Ehitustööriist. The team's results improved slowly as Ehitustööriist finished the league in 7th place for four consecutive seasons. In 2003, the club merged with Audentes and became Ehitustööriist/Audentes, while the former Estonia national team coach Maarten van Gent was hired as head coach. The team finished the 2003–04 season in 5th place. After the season, Ehitustööriist/Audentes dissolved and both clubs continued separately.

In 2004, Ehitustööriist moved to the new 7,200-seat Saku Suurhall. The team finished the 2004–05 regular season with a 12–4 record and dominant in the playoffs. In the finals, they faced University of Tartu. Ehitustööriist won the series and the team's first Estonian Championship 4 games to 3. Howard Frier was named Most Valuable Player of the season. The team also competed in the regional Baltic Basketball League for the first time, finishing in 7th place with an 8–10 record.

BC Kalev/Cramo (2005–present)
Coming off their first Estonian Championship, Ehitustööriist leased the trademark "Kalev" from AS Kalev and became BC Kalev/Cramo. Allan Dorbek was replaced as head coach by former Estonia national team shooting guard Aivar Kuusmaa for the 2005–06 season. On 2 October 2005, the team won their first Estonian Cup, defeating University of Tartu 70–64 in the final. Kalev/Cramo also made their debut in Europe, entering the 2005–06 season of the FIBA EuroCup but failed to advance past the group stage with just one victory in 6 games. In the KML, Kalev/Cramo finished the regular season in first place with a 21–3 record and reached the finals in the playoffs. The team defended their title, defeating University of Tartu 4 games to 3, winning the deciding seventh game 69–68. James Williams was named Finals MVP and Kuusmaa won the Coach of the Year award. Despite that, Kuusmaa was replaced by Veselin Matić for the 2006–07 season. 

The team won their second Estonian Cup in 2006, but was unable to defend the title. Kalev/Cramo reached the finals but lost the series 2–4 to University of Tartu. Despite losing in the finals, Valmo Kriisa won the Estonian Player of the Year award, while Travis Reed was named KML and BBL MVP and Matić won the Coach of the Year award. Kalev/Cramo saw limited success in Europe, reaching the second round in the 2006–07 FIBA EuroCup and competing in the European second tier 2007–08 ULEB Cup, but a record of 3–7 wasn't enough to advance past the group stage. The team won another Estonian Cup in 2007 and reached the finals in the 2007–08 season, but were swept by University of Tartu.

In 2008, Nenad Vučinić replaced Matić as head coach. Kalev/Cramo won their fourth consecutive Estonian Cup in 2008. The team finished the 2008–09 regular season in second place. In the semi-finals, Kalev/Cramo easily dispatched TTÜ in three games to reach the finals. In the finals, the team defeated University of Tartu 4 games to 2 and captured their third title. Forward Kristjan Kangur was named Finals MVP and the Estonian Player of the Year. In 2009, the team joined the newly established VTB United League. In December 2009, Vučinić left Kalev/Cramo. The team struggled in the 2009–10 season and finished the regular season in fourth place with a 19–9 record under the former assistant coach Alar Varrak. The team lost in the semi-finals to University of Tartu but won the bronze medals in the third place games, winning the series in two games against TTÜ.

In July 2010, Aivar Kuusmaa returned to Kalev/Cramo. Led by Gregor Arbet and Armands Šķēle, the team finished the 2010–11 regular season in first place. In the playoffs, Kalev/Cramo swept Rakvere Tarvas in the semi-finals 3–0 and University of Tartu in the finals 4–0. Šķēle was named Finals MVP and Kuusmaa won his second Coach of the Year award. Kalev/Cramo defended their title in the 2011–12 season, defeating Tartu Ülikool in the finals in a four-game sweep. Tanel Sokk was named Finals MVP and Kuusmaa once again won the Coach of the Year award.

Kalev/Cramo struggled early in the 2012–13 season and after a 69–95 defeat to Rakvere Tarvas on 22 November 2012, Kuusmaa was sacked, with assistant coach Alar Varrak taking over the coaching reins. Despite the poor start, Kalev/Cramo finished the regular season in first place and swept the playoffs. Kalev/Cramo won their 6th Estonian Championship as Tanel Sokk claimed his second straight Finals MVP award. Alar Varrak was named Coach of the Year. The team also placed third in the 2012–13 Baltic Basketball League. With star players Gregor Arbet and Frank Elegar and the additions of Vlad Moldoveanu and Rain Veideman, the team's success continued in the 2013–14 season. Kalev/Cramo once again finished the regular season in first place and was undefeated in the playoffs. Kalev/Cramo won their fourth consecutive Estonian Championship, while Moldoveanu was named Finals MVP and Varrak won his second Coach of the Year award. The team finished the 2014–15 regular season in second place. Kalev/Cramo swept TTÜ in the quarter-finals and Rapla in the semi-finals. In the finals, Kalev/Cramo once again faced University of Tartu, but lost the series 1–4. On 20 December 2015, Kalev/Cramo won their fifth Estonian Cup, defeating University of Tartu 73–55 in the final. Kalev/Cramo finished the 2015–16 season regular season in first place and undefeated. The team extended their winning streak in the quarter- and semi-finals. In the finals, the team faced University of Tartu and won the series 4 games to 1, the single loss being the team's only defeat in the season. Rolands Freimanis was named Finals MVP. Kalev/Cramo defended their title in the 2016–17 season, facing Rapla in the finals and winning the series 4 games to 0. Branko Mirković was named Finals MVP. In November 2017, Varrak was sacked and replaced by Donaldas Kairys. The team won their third consecutive league title in the  2017–18 season, defeating University of Tartu in the finals 4 games to 0. Kristjan Kangur, who returned to the club for the season, was named Finals MVP. In the 2018–19 season, Kalev/Cramo finished the inaugural Estonian-Latvian Basketball League in third place and won their fourth consecutive KML title.

On September 17, 2021, Kalev beat Juventus 77–70 in the final qualifying round of the Basketball Champions League and became the first Estonian team to qualify for the competition's regular season.

On February 24, 2022 Kalev terminated their membership with VTB United League due to Russian war against Ukraine.

Sponsorship naming
The team has had several denominations through the years due to its sponsorship. In 2005, the team leased the trademark "Kalev" from AS Kalev and became BC Kalev/Cramo.

Canon ENM: 1998–1999
Ehitustööriist: 1999–2001
Ehitustööriist/Kalev: 2001–2003
Ehitustööriist/Audentes: 2003–2004
Ehitustööriist: 2004–2005
BC Kalev/Cramo: 2005–present

Logos

Home arenas

Kalev Sports Hall: (1998–2002, 2017–present)
Valtu Sports Hall: (2002–2003)
Audentes Sports Center: (2003–2004)
Saku Suurhall: (2004–present)

Players

Current roster

Depth chart

Coaches

 Allan Dorbek: 1998–2003
 Maarten van Gent: 2003–2004
 Allan Dorbek: 2004–2005
 Aivar Kuusmaa: 2005–2006
 Veselin Matić: 2006–2008
 Nenad Vučinić: 2008–2009
 Alar Varrak: 2010
 Aivar Kuusmaa: 2010–2012
 Alar Varrak: 2012–2017
 Donaldas Kairys: 2017–2019
 Roberts Štelmahers: 2019–2022
 Heiko Rannula: 2022–

Season by season

Trophies and awards

Trophies
Estonian Championship: (12)
2004–05, 2005–06, 2008–09, 2010–11, 2011–12, 2012–13, 2013–14, 2015–16, 2016–17, 2017–18, 2019, 2021
Runners-up (3): 2006–07, 2007–08, 2014–15

Estonian Cup: (8)
2005, 2006, 2007, 2008, 2015, 2016, 2020, 2022
Runners-up (4): 2009, 2011, 2013, 2021

Estonian-Latvian Championship: (1)
2020–21

Individual awards

Estonian Player of the Year
Valmo Kriisa – 2007
Kristjan Kangur – 2009

KML MVP
Howard Frier – 2005
Travis Reed – 2007

KML Finals MVP
Tanel Sokk – 2012, 2013
Kristjan Kangur – 2009, 2018
Branko Mirković – 2017, 2019
James Williams – 2006
Armands Šķēle – 2011
Vlad Moldoveanu – 2014
Rolands Freimanis – 2016
Chavaughn Lewis – 2021

KML Best Defender
Bamba Fall – 2012
Gregor Arbet – 2014

KML Coach of the Year
Aivar Kuusmaa – 2006, 2011, 2012
Alar Varrak – 2013, 2014, 2016
Donaldas Kairys – 2018, 2019
Allan Dorbek – 2005
Veselin Matić – 2007
Nenad Vučinić – 2009
Roberts Štelmahers – 2021

VTB United League Young Player of the Year
Isaiah Briscoe – 2018

BBL MVP
Travis Reed – 2007

All-KML Team
Gregor Arbet – 2011, 2012, 2015, 2016
Kristjan Kangur – 2007, 2008
Tanel Sokk – 2012, 2013
Frank Elegar – 2013, 2014
Howard Frier – 2005
Víctor González – 2005
Rait Keerles – 2006
Valmo Kriisa – 2007
Travis Reed – 2007
Charron Fisher – 2010
Armands Šķēle – 2011
Bamba Fall – 2013
Rain Veideman – 2014
Scott Machado – 2015
Shawn King – 2016
Sten Sokk – 2016
Branko Mirković – 2017
Isaiah Briscoe – 2018
Bojan Subotić – 2018
Chavaughn Lewis – 2019
Arnett Moultrie – 2019
Janari Jõesaar – 2021
Marcus Keene – 2021
Devin Thomas – 2021

References

External links

 

BC Kalev/Cramo
Kalev
Basketball teams established in 1998
1998 establishments in Estonia
Sport in Tallinn
Korvpalli Meistriliiga